Thomas James Vilsack (born December 13, 1950) is an American politician serving as the 32nd United States Secretary of Agriculture in the Biden administration. He previously served in the role from 2009 to 2017 during the Obama administration. A member of the Democratic Party, he served as the 40th governor of Iowa from 1999 to 2007.

On November 30, 2006, he formally launched his candidacy for the Democratic presidential nomination in the 2008 election, but ended his bid on February 23, 2007. Then-President-elect Barack Obama announced Vilsack's selection to be Secretary of Agriculture on December 17, 2008. His nomination was confirmed by the United States Senate by unanimous consent on January 20, 2009. Until his January 13, 2017 resignation one week prior to the end of Obama's second term as president, he had been the only member of the U.S. Cabinet who had served since the day Obama originally took office.  he was the fourth-longest-serving holder of the office.

On July 19, 2016, The Washington Post reported that Vilsack was on Hillary Clinton's two-person shortlist to be her running mate for that year's presidential election. U.S. Senator Tim Kaine from Virginia was ultimately selected. On December 10, 2020, President-elect Joe Biden announced his intention to nominate Vilsack to once again serve as Secretary of Agriculture in the incoming Biden administration. Vilsack was confirmed by the U.S. Senate on February 23, 2021 by a vote of 92–7.

Early life and education
Vilsack was born on December 13, 1950 in a Roman Catholic orphanage in Pittsburgh, Pennsylvania, where his 23-year-old birth mother (a secretary) had lived since September 1950 under the pseudonym of "Gloria"; he was baptized as "Kenneth". He was adopted in 1951 by Bud, a real-estate agent and insurance salesman, and Dolly Vilsack. They named him Thomas James.

Vilsack attended Shady Side Academy, a preparatory high school in Pittsburgh. He received a bachelor's degree in 1972 from Hamilton College. While at Hamilton, he joined the Delta Upsilon fraternity. He received a Juris Doctor from Albany Law School in 1975.

Early political career
In Mount Pleasant, Vilsack raised funds to rebuild an athletic facility for young people; in a 2016 interview, he describes himself "as the Jerry Lewis of Mount Pleasant for a couple days" when he hosted a pledge drive on the local radio station to raise the funds. This led him to involvement in the local Chamber of Commerce and United Way. He and his wife volunteered in the failed 1988 presidential campaign of then senator Joe Biden.

After the mayor of Mount Pleasant was gunned down in December 1986, Vilsack led a fundraising drive to build a memorial fountain. The deceased mayor's father asked Vilsack to run for mayor of Mount Pleasant; he was elected and began serving in 1987. He was elected to the Iowa Senate in 1992. Following his election, he worked on legislation requiring companies who received state tax incentives to provide better pay and benefits. He helped pass a law for workers to receive health coverage when changing jobs and helped redesign Iowa's Workforce Development Department. He also wrote a bill to have the State of Iowa assume a 50% share of local county mental health costs.

Governor of Iowa
In 1998, Terry Branstad chose not to seek re-election after 16 years as governor. The Iowa Republican Party nominated Jim Ross Lightfoot, a former U.S. Representative. Vilsack defeated former Iowa Supreme Court Justice Mark McCormick in the Democratic primary and chose Sally Pederson as his running mate. Lightfoot was the odds-on favorite to succeed Branstad and polls consistently showed him in the lead. However, Vilsack narrowly won the general election and became the first Democrat to serve as governor of Iowa in thirty years and only the fifth Democrat to hold the office in the 20th century.

During the 2000 contest for the Democratic presidential nomination between Vice President Al Gore and former U.S. Senator Bill Bradley, he remained neutral.

In 2002 he won his second term in office by defeating Republican challenger attorney Doug Gross by eight percentage points.

In the first year of his second term, Vilsack used a line-item veto, later ruled unconstitutional by the Iowa Supreme Court, to create the Grow Iowa Values Fund, a $503million appropriation designed to boost the Iowa economy by offering grants to corporations and initiatives pledged to create higher-income jobs. He vetoed portions of the bill that would have cut income taxes and eased business regulations. After a special session of the Iowa General Assembly on September 7, 2004, $100million in state money was set aside to honor previously made commitments. The Grow Iowa Values Fund was reinstated at the end of the 2005 session: under the current law, $50million per year will be set aside over the next ten years.

For most of Vilsack's tenure as governor, Republicans held effective majorities in the Iowa General Assembly. Following the November 2, 2004, elections, the fifty-member Senate was evenly split between Democrats and Republicans, and Republicans held a 51–49 majority in the House of Representatives.

In July 2005, Vilsack signed an executive order allowing all felons who had served their sentences to vote. Approximately 115,000 felons regained their voting rights. He said: "When you've paid your debt to society, you need to be reconnected and re-engaged to society." Previously, convicted felons were disenfranchised, but could petition the governor to initiate a process, normally requiring six months, to restore their right to vote.

During the 2005 legislative session, Vilsack signed legislation designed to reduce methamphetamine use. It imposed greater restrictions on products containing the active ingredient pseudoephedrine, requiring them to be sold behind pharmacy counters rather than via open-access. It required purchasers to show identification and sign a logbook. It took effect on May 21, 2005.

Following the U.S. Supreme Court decision in Kelo v. City of New London in June 2005, Vilsack vetoed a bill to restrict Iowa's use of eminent domain, citing its potential for negative impact on job creation. He said: "You have an interesting balance between job growth, which everybody supports, and restricting the power of government, which a lot of people support." His veto was overridden by the legislature.

Vilsack is a former member of the National Governors Association Executive Committee. He was chair of the Democratic Governors Association in 2004. He was also chair of the Governors Biotechnology Partnership, the Governors Ethanol Coalition, and the Midwest Governors Conference, and has also been chair and vice-chair of the National Governors Association's committee on Natural Resources, where he worked to develop the NGA's farm and energy policies.

Vilsack was thought to be high on the list of potential running mates for Kerry in the 2004 presidential election. In 2005, Vilsack established Heartland PAC, a political action committee aimed at electing Democratic governors. In the first report, he raised over half a million dollars. Vilsack left office in 2007; he did not seek a third term and was succeeded by Chet Culver.

2008 U.S. presidential campaign

On November 30, 2006, Tom Vilsack became the second Democrat (after Mike Gravel) to officially announce intentions to run for the presidency in the 2008 election. In his announcement speech, he said "America's a great country, and now I have the opportunity to begin the process, the legal process of filing papers to run for President of the United States." Vilsack dropped out of the race on February 23, 2007, citing monetary constraints.

Vilsack's campaign made significant use of social media by maintaining an active MySpace profile, a collection of viral video clips on YouTube, a Facebook profile, videoblog on blip.tv, and a conference call with the podcast site TalkShoe. On January 27, 2007, Vilsack called into the Regular Guys Show hosted by Kurt Hurner to conduct a 15‑minute interview on his running for the Democratic nomination for 2008. Since then, Vilsack appeared again on the show, now The Kurt Hurner Show at Talk Shoe on August 12, 2008, this time as a supporter of Barack Obama for president taking questions from callers to the program for 30 minutes.

During the campaign, Vilsack joined fellow candidates Hillary Clinton and Joe Biden in supporting the establishment of a U.S. Public Service Academy as a civilian counterpart to the military academies.

Shortly after ending his 2008 bid for the White House, Vilsack endorsed Senator Hillary Clinton and was named the national co-chair for Clinton's presidential campaign.

Views on Iraq
Vilsack was critical of President Bush's execution of the war in Iraq, but he hesitated to call for an immediate and complete pullout of U.S. forces: "I don't think we're losing in Iraq. It appears to be a draw. People are upset by the fact that their kids are over there and there doesn't seem to be any end to this whole process. It's not pacifism that makes people think this way. They're questioning the credibility and competence of the Commander-in-Chief."

On December 5, Vilsack announced that he favored withdrawing most U.S. forces from Iraq and leaving a small force in the northern region for a limited period. He said U.S. forces provided the Iraqi government with "both a crutch and an excuse" for inaction. He said U.S. withdrawal "may very well require them to go through some chaotic and very difficult times", but that he believed it the only way to force the Iraqi government to take control of the country.

Views on energy security
The Vilsack Energy Security Agenda set out a strategy to dramatically reduce U.S. reliance on foreign energy and to cut the United States' carbon emissions. It also called for replacing the Department of Energy with a new Department of Energy Security, to oversee and redefine the federal government's role in energy policy. The reorganized department would have acted as an institutional advocate for innovation in energy policy and was intended to ensure accountability as the nation works towards achieving its energy security goals. Through this new department, America's overriding objective in energy policy would have been to make America the unquestioned leader in clean energy, enhancing national security and economic strength.

In a 2007 lecture to the Commonwealth Club of California, Vilsack stated:

Secretary of Agriculture (2009–2017)

Appointment

On December 17, 2008, then-President-elect Barack Obama announced his choice of Vilsack as the nominee to be the 30th Secretary of Agriculture. Vilsack has governed a largely agricultural state as did the previous two Secretaries of Agriculture, Mike Johanns (who was later a United States Senator from Nebraska) (2005–2007) and Ed Schafer (2007–2009).

The Senate confirmed Vilsack's nomination for the position by unanimous consent on January 20, 2009.

Reaction to Vilsack's nomination from agricultural groups was largely positive and included endorsements from the Corn Refiners Association, the National Grain and Feed Association, the National Farmers Union, the American Farm Bureau Federation, and the Environmental Defense Fund. Vilsack was the founder and former chair of the Governor's Biotechnology Partnership, and was named Governor of the Year by the Biotechnology Industry Organization, an industry lobbying group.

Actions
Vilsack appointed Shirley Sherrod as the Georgia Director of Rural Development, saying she would be an "important advocate on behalf of rural communities". Months after the appointment, Vilsack forced her to resign based on accusations of considering race in the handling of her job responsibilities at a private advocacy firm in 1986. Subsequent reports claimed that Vilsack had overreacted to a selectively edited tape of a speech that Sherrod had given to the NAACP.  The edited tape had been posted online by conservative blogger Andrew Breitbart. Vilsack expressed his "deep regret" to Sherrod in acting hastily.

On January 24, 2012, Obama appointed Vilsack the designated survivor during the President's State of the Union address.

Beef advocacy
In March 2012, Vilsack joined three midwest governors in a campaign to defend the use of a processed beef product made from trimmings left after beef carcasses are butchered, dubbed "pink slime" by its critics. He said "it's safe, it contains less fat and historically it's been less expensive" and that it should be available to consumers and school districts that want to buy it.

Global warming
At a Drake University forum on climate change April 22, 2014, Vilsack stated "agriculture tends to take the brunt of criticism about climate change, but the industry contributes only 9percent of the greenhouse gases blamed for a warming planet" and that while there were "challenges globally in terms of agriculture and its contribution to greenhouse gas emissions that's not necessarily the case in the United States."

Considered resignation
In 2015, Vilsack told President Obama he was considering resigning from his position. The Washington Post reported that he said, "There are days when I have literally nothing to do" as he weighed his decision to quit. Obama asked Vilsack to remain in his position and asked him to look into the problem of opioid addiction.

Between cabinet tenures
Shortly after his tenure ended, Vilsack released a statement in support of his succession by Sonny Perdue as the Secretary of Agriculture, making Perdue the only cabinet member nominee to receive a public statement of support from an Obama cabinet member. He was mentioned as a possible candidate for the United States Senate in 2020, for the seat currently held by Republican incumbent Joni Ernst, but subsequently declined to run.

In February 2017, Vilsack became President and CEO of the US Dairy Export Council.

Vilsack endorsed Joe Biden in the 2020 Democratic Party presidential primaries.

Secretary of Agriculture (2021–present)

Nomination and confirmation hearings
In December 2020, Biden announced he would nominate Vilsack to again serve as the Secretary of Agriculture. The move was met by some with criticism from black farmers and progressives, because of Vilsack's perceived relationship with status quo and corporate agriculture. He appeared before the Senate Agriculture Committee on February 2, 2021, and was unanimously approved. His nomination was confirmed by the Senate on February 23, 2021, by a 92–7 vote. He was sworn into office by Vice President Kamala Harris on February 24, 2021.

Tenure 
During his tenure, Vilsack announced that the USDA would leverage $100 million in funding from the American Rescue Plan Act to expand America's meat processing capacity.

Personal life
Vilsack met his wife, Ann Christine "Christie" Bell, in a cafeteria while at Hamilton College in New York in October 1968. Vilsack approached her and asked, "Are you a Humphrey or a Nixon supporter?" She replied "Humphrey" and they soon began dating. On August 18, 1973, the couple was married in Christie Vilsack's hometown of Mount Pleasant, Iowa. Vilsack and his wife moved to Mount Pleasant in 1975, where he joined his father-in-law's law practice.

Tom and Christie Vilsack have two sons, Jess and Doug.

In May 2017, Vilsack's six-year-old granddaughter, Ella, died of complications from influenza.

Vilsack won $150,000 in the Powerball in 2020.

Electoral history

1992 election for Iowa State Senate, 49th District:
Democratic Primary
Tom Vilsack (D), 100.0%

1992 General Election:
Tom Vilsack (D), 50.1% – 12,544 votes
Dave Heaton (R), 42.1% – 10,551 votes
Dan Reed (I), 7.8% – 1,945 votes1994 election for Iowa State Senate, 49th District:Democratic PrimaryTom Vilsack (D), 99.9% – 1,201 votes
scattering, 0.1% – 1 vote1994 General Election:
Tom Vilsack (D), 98.8% – 12,288 votes
scattering, 1.2% – 145 votes

References

External links

Biography at the United States Department of Agriculture
Biography at the United States Department of Agriculture (2009–2017, archived)
Appearances on Charlie Rose

1950 births
Living people
20th-century American politicians
21st-century American politicians
Albany Law School alumni
American adoptees
Biden administration cabinet members
Candidates in the 2008 United States presidential election
Catholics from Pennsylvania
Catholics from Iowa
Democratic Party governors of Iowa
Hamilton College (New York) alumni
Iowa lawyers
Democratic Party Iowa state senators
Obama administration cabinet members
Mayors of places in Iowa
People from Mount Pleasant, Iowa
Politicians from Pittsburgh
Shady Side Academy alumni
United States Secretaries of Agriculture
Biden administration personnel